Penaeidae is a family of marine crustaceans in the suborder Dendrobranchiata, which are often referred to as penaeid shrimp or penaeid prawns. The Penaeidae contain many species of economic importance, such as the tiger prawn, whiteleg shrimp, Atlantic white shrimp, and Indian prawn. Many prawns are the subject of commercial fishery, and farming, both in marine settings, and in freshwater farms. Lateral line–like sense organs on the antennae have been reported in some species of Penaeidae. At , the myelinated giant interneurons of pelagic penaeid shrimp have the world record for impulse conduction speed in any animal.

Genera
Of the 48 recognised genera in the family Penaeidae, 23 are known only from the fossil record (marked †):

 † Albertoppelia Schweigert & Garassino, 2004
 † Ambilobeia Garassino & Pasini, 2002
 † Antrimpos Münster, 1839
 Artemesia Bate, 1888
 Atypopenaeus Alcock, 1905
 † Bombur Münster, 1839
 † Bylgia Münster, 1839
 † Carinacaris Garassino, 1994
 † Cretapenaeus Garassino, Pasini & Dutheil, 2006
 † Drobna Münster, 1839
 † Dusa Münster, 1839
 Farfantepenaeus Burukovsky, 1997
 Fenneropenaeus Pérez Farfante, 1969
 Funchalia Johnson, 1868
 † Hakelocaris Garassino, 1994
 Heteropenaeus De Man, 1896
 † Ifasya Garassino & Teruzzi, 1995
 † Koelga Münster, 1839
 † Libanocaris Garassino, 1994
 Litopenaeus Pérez Farfante, 1969
 † Longichela Garassino & Teruzzi, 1993
 † Longitergite Garassino & Teruzzi, 1996
 † Macropenaeus Garassino, 1994
 Macropetasma Stebbing, 1914
 Marsupenaeus Tirmizi, 1971
 Megokris Pérez Farfante & Kensley, 1997
 Melicertus Rafinesque, 1814
 Metapenaeopsis Bouvier, 1905
 Metapenaeus Wood-Mason & Alcock, 1891
 † Microchela Garassino, 1994
 † Micropenaeus Bravi & Garassino, 1998
 Parapenaeopsis Alcock, 1901
 Parapenaeus Smith, 1885
 Pelagopenaeus Pérez Farfante & Kensley, 1997
 Penaeopsis Bate, 1881
 Penaeus Fabricius, 1798
 Protrachypene Burkenroad, 1934
 † Pseudobombur Secretan, 1975
 † Pseudodusa Schweigert & Garassino, 2004
 † Rauna Münster, 1839
 † Rhodanicaris Van Straelen, 1924
 Rimapenaeus Pérez Farfante & Kensley, 1997
 † Satyrocaris Garassino & Teruzzi, 1993
 Tanypenaeus Pérez Farfante, 1972
 Trachypenaeopsis Burkenroad, 1934
 Trachypenaeus Alcock, 1901
 Trachysalambria Burkenroad, 1934
 Xiphopenaeus Smith, 1869

References

 
Dendrobranchiata
Extant Triassic first appearances
Taxa named by Constantine Samuel Rafinesque
Decapod families